Peter Katholos (born 18 March 1961) is an Australian former soccer player. He was a member of the Socceroos, Australia's national soccer team, throughout the 1980s during which time he made 22 international appearances (14 ' A-matches'), scoring two goals. He is best known for his time as a midfielder with Sydney Olympic and later Marconi in the Australian National Soccer League, although he also played for the Greek team Larissa at one stage.

Katholos emigrated from Greece to Australia with his parents as a nine-year-old.

Playing career

Club career
Katholos played for St George 35 times during the 1979 and 1980 National Soccer League seasons.

Katholos transferred from St George to the Sydney Olympians (as Sydney Olympic were branded in 1981), where he played under Scottish coach Tommy Docherty.

In 1985, Katholos signed a three-year contract to play in Greece for Larissa. He returned to Australia in mid-1986, having only played three times in the league, each time as a substitute.

After a disagreement with coach Peter Raskopoulos, Katholos transferred from Olympic to Parramatta Eagles part way though the 1992–93 National Soccer League season.

He was nicknamed "The Kat" by Sydney Olympic supporters.

International career
Katholos made his national team debut for Australia against Indonesia in Melbourne in May 1981. He played the last of his 14 full international appearances in December 1983 against Singapore.

Honours

Player
Sydney Olympic
NSL Cup: 1983, 1985

APIA Leichhardt
National Soccer League Championship: 1987

Marconi-Fairfield
National Soccer League Championship: 1988, 1989

Individual
National Soccer League Player of the Year: 1982

References

External links
Peter Katholos at Aussie Footballers
Technikfootball Profile

1961 births
Living people
Greek emigrants to Australia
Australian soccer players
Australian expatriate soccer players
Australia international soccer players
National Soccer League (Australia) players
APIA Leichhardt FC players
Sydney Olympic FC players
Marconi Stallions FC players
Association football midfielders
Naturalized citizens of Greece
Greek people of Australian descent